Magec (Guanche Berber Ma-ɣeq, "possesses radiance" or "mother of brightness" ), in Tenerife, was a deity in the ancient Berber mythology. Magec was god or goddess (actual gender is unknown) of the Sun and light and is thought to be one of the principal divinities in the Guanche religion. According to legend, Magec was captured by Guayota and held prisoner inside Teide before later being liberated by Achamán.

See also 
 List of solar deities
 Guanche Religion

References 
 

Guanche deities
Berber deities
Solar deities